Baghshan-e Gach (also Romanized as Bāghshan-e Gach and Bāghshan Gach; also known as  Bāghash Kach, Bāghash Gach, Baghīshan, and Bāghīshan Gach) is a village in Mazul Rural District, in the Central District of Nishapur County, Razavi Khorasan Province, Iran. At the 2006 census, its population was 3,712, in 986 families.

See also 

 List of cities, towns and villages in Razavi Khorasan Province

References 

Populated places in Nishapur County